Lonjin is a village in Serbia. It is situated in the Ljubovija municipality, in the Mačva District of Central Serbia. The village had a Serb ethnic majority and a population of 337 in 2002.

Historical population

1948: 341
1953: 349
1961: 334
1971: 301
1981: 286
1991: 388
2002: 337

References

See also
List of places in Serbia

Populated places in Mačva District
Ljubovija